Livadia is a small village in the Nicosia District of Cyprus, near Chandria.

References

Communities in Nicosia District